Ultra is the fourth studio album by British electronic musician Zomby. It was released via Hyperdub on 2 September 2016. It features contributions from Banshee, Burial, Darkstar, and Rezzett.

Critical reception

At Metacritic, which assigns a weighted average score out of 100 to reviews from mainstream critics, Ultra received an average score of 71 out of 100 based on 18 reviews, indicating "generally favorable reviews".

Andy Kellman of AllMusic gave the album 3 stars out of 5 and said, "Although it's not without some dazzling moments, this is the Zomby album with the lowest quantity of thrills." KC Orcutt of Consequence of Sound gave the album a grade of C, saying, "On Ultra, it simply feels as though something is missing, and overall, makes more sense as an appetizer than the entrée." Isa Jaward of The Observer gave the album 4 stars out of 5, calling it "an unapologetic pastiche of 90s rave culture and retro video games."

It ranked at number 48 on The Wires "Top 50 Releases of 2016" list.

Track listing

Charts

References

External links
 

2016 albums
Zomby albums
Hyperdub albums